Gus Pixley (1864 – June 2, 1923) was an American actor-singer and comic on the theatre stage, and an actor of the silent era. He appeared in burlesque, vaudeville, and minstrelsy with "America's greatest female impersonator," Burton Stanley. They toured widely with Emerson's Minstrels in the United States and Australia in the 1880s and 1890s. Pixley was on Broadway and toured America in Victor Herbert's musical Babes In Toyland as the character "Inspector Marmaduke." Pixley appeared in more than 130 films between 1910 and 1921. He died in Saranac Lake, New York on June 2, 1923, at age 49.

Partial filmography
 For His Son (1912 short) (uncredited)
 The Transformation of Mike (1912 short)
 So Near, Yet So Far (1912 short)
 At Coney Island (1912 short)
 Brutality (1912 short)
 My Hero (1912 short) (unconfirmed)
 The Water Nymph (1912)
 The Mothering Heart (1913 short) (uncredited)
 Almost a Wild Man (1913)
 Lord Chumley (1914 short)
 The Girl from Porcupine (1921)

References

External links

 

1864 births
1923 deaths
American male film actors
American male silent film actors
20th-century American male actors
American male stage actors